Seeing Islam As Others Saw It: A Survey and Evaluation of Christian, Jewish and Zoroastrian Writings on Early Islam from the Studies in Late Antiquity and Early Islam series is a book by scholar of the Middle East Robert G. Hoyland.

The book contains an extensive collection of Greek, Syriac, Coptic, Armenian, Latin, Jewish, Persian, and Chinese primary sources written between 620 and 780 AD in the Middle East, which provides a survey of eyewitness accounts of historical events during the formative period of Islam.

The book presents the evidentiary text of over 120 seventh-century sources, one of which (Thomas the Presbyter) contains what Hoyland believes is the "first explicit reference to Muhammad in a non-Muslim source:"

According to Michael G. Morony, Hoyland emphasizes the parallels between Muslim and non-Muslim accounts of history emphasizing that non-Muslim texts often explain the same history as the Muslim ones even though they were recorded earlier. He concludes "Hoyland's treatment of the materials is judicious, honest, complex, and extremely useful."

Sources

Greek sources

 A Christian Apologist of 634
 John Moschus
 Sophronius, Patriarch of Jerusalem
 Pope Martin I
 Maximus the Confessor
 Anti-Jewish Polemicists of the Seventh Century
 The Miracles of S. Demetrius and S. George
 Anastasius of Sinai
 Patriarch Germanus
 Cosmas of Jerusalem
 Stephen the Sabaite
 John the Eremopolite
 A Greek-Coptic Papyrus
 Berlin Papyrus 10677
 Timothy the Stylite

West Syrian, Coptic and Armenian sources
 Fragment on the Arab Conquests
 Thomas the Presbyter
 Homily on the Child Saints of Babylon
 Gabriel of Qartmin
 Sebeos, Bishop of the Bagratunis
 Benjamin I, Patriarch of Alexandria
 Maronite Chronicle
 George of Resh'aina
 Daniel, Bishop of Edessa
 Athanasius of Balad, Patriarch of Antioch 
 Isaac, Patriarch of Alexandria
 John, Bishop of Nikiu
 Theodotus of Amida
 Jacob of Edessa
 Zacharias, Bishop of Sakha
 Simeon of the Olives
 A Coptic Papyrus
 Theophilus I of Alexandria
 Letter of Bishop Jonah

East Syrian sources
 Isho'yahb III of Adiabene
 Chronicle of Khuzestan
 Rabban Hormizd
 John bar Penkaye
 Hnanisho' the Exegete
 John of Daylam
 Isho'bokht, Metropolitan of Fars
 Abbots of the Monastery of Sabrisho'
 Isho'dnah of Basra
 Thomas of Marga

Latin sources
 Fredegar, a Frankish Chronicler
 Arculf
 Willibald
 Later testimonia
 Historia miscella
 Morienus the Greek

Chinese sources
 T'ung tien
 The Official T'ang History
 Ts'e-fu yuan-kuei

Apocalypses and visions

Syriac texts
 Ps.-Ephraem
 Ps.-Methodius
 Edessene Pseudo-Methodius and John the Little
 Bahira
 Pseudo-Ezra
 Copto-Arabic texts
 Pseudo-Shenoute
 Apocalypse of Pseudo-Athanasius
 Apocalypse of Samuel of Qalamun and Pisentius of Qift
 Coptic Apocalypse of Daniel
 Book of the Rolls

Greek texts
 Pseudo-Methodius, Greek translation
 Greek Apocalypse of Daniel
 Vision of Enoch the Just
 Stephen of Alexandria
 Life of Andrew the Fool

Hebrew texts
 The Secrets of Rabbi Simon ben Yohai
 Pesiqta rabbati
 Pirkei de-Rabbi Eliezer
 Jewish Apocalypse on the Umayyads
 Signs of the Messiah
 On That Day
 Hazzan Daniel

Persian texts
 Bahman Yasht
 Jamasp Namag
 Bundahishn
 Denkard
 A Pahlavi Ballad on the End of Times
 The Prophecy of Rostam
 Persian Apocalypse of Daniel

Muslim Arabic texts
 Signs of the Hour
 `Abd Allah ibn al-Zubayr and the Mahdi
 Tiberius, Son of Justinian
 An Apocalyptic Chronicle

Martyrologies

Greek texts
 Sixty Martyrs of Gaza
 George the Black
 A Christian Arab of Sinai
 Peter of Capitolias
 Sixty Pilgrims in Jerusalem
 Elias of Damascus
 Romanus the Neomartyr
 Copto-Arabic texts
 Menas the Monk
 Thomas, Bishop of Damascus

Armenian texts
 David of Dwin

Syriac texts
 Michael the Sabaite
 `Abd al-Masih al-Najrani al-Ghassani
 A Muslim at Diospolis

Chronicles and histories

Syriac texts

 Theophilus of Edessa
 Chronicle of Zuqnin
 Ehnesh inscription
 Dionysius of Tellmahre
 Chronicle of 819
 Chronicle of 846
 Elias of Nisibis

Latin texts
Byzantine-Arab Chronicle of 741
Hispanic Chronicle of 754

Greek texts
 Theophanes the Confessor
 Patriarch Nicephorus
 A Short Chronology ad annum 818

Other
 Armenian texts
 Christian Arabic texts
 Agapius of Hierapolis
 Eutychius of Alexandria
 Chronicle of Siirt
 History of the Patriarchs of Alexandria
 Jewish texts
 Samaritan texts
 Derivative accounts

Apologies and disputations

Syriac texts
 Patriarch John I and an Arab commander
 Monk of Beth Hale and an Arab notable
 Timothy I
 Bahira
 Greek texts
 John of Damascus
 correspondence of Leo III the Isaurian and Umar II

Christian Arabic texts
 Fi tathlith Allah al-wahid
 Papyrus Schott Reinhard no. 438
 Masa'il wa-ajwiba `aqliya wa-ilahiya

Jewish texts
 The Ten Wise Jews
 Targum Pseudo-Jonathan

Latin texts
 Istoria de Mahomet
 Tultusceptru de libro domni Metobii

Dubia
 John the Stylite
 Abjuration
 MS Mingana 184

See also
 Islamic studies by author

References and notes

Non-Islamic Islam studies literature
Islam and other religions